Conus moluccensis, common name the Molucca cone, is a species of sea snail, a marine gastropod mollusk in the family Conidae, the cone snails and their allies.

Like all species within the genus Conus, these snails are predatory and venomous. They are capable of "stinging" humans, therefore live ones should be handled carefully or not at all.

Subspecies 
 Conus moluccensis marielae Rehder & Wilson, 1975: synonym of Conus marielae Rehder & Wilson, 1975
 Conus moluccensis moluccensis Küster, 1838: synonym of Conus moluccensis Küster, 1838
 Conus moluccensis vappereaui Monteiro, 2009: synonym of Conus vappereaui Monteiro, 2009

Description
The size of an adult shell varies between 30 mm and 60 mm. The coronated shell is yellowish white, marbled and streaked with chestnut, with minute revolving lines of granules, which are often somewhat articulated red-brown and white.

Distribution
This species occurs in the Indian Ocean off the Mascarene Basin; off Fiji, Indo-China, Indonesia, Maldives, New Caledonia, Papua New Guinea, Philippines, Solomon Islands; off Australia (Queensland).

References

 Küster, H.C. 1838. Die Gattung Conus. 121 in Küster, H.C., Martini, F.W. & Chemnitz, J.H. (eds). Systematisches Conchylien-Cabinet. Nürnberg : Bauer & Raspe Vol. 4. 
 Reeve, L.A. 1843. Monograph of the genus Conus. pls 1–39 in Reeve, L.A. (ed.). Conchologica Iconica. London : L. Reeve & Co. Vol. 1. 
 Mayissian, S. 1974. Coquillages de Nouvelle-Caledonie et Melanesie. Place of publishing unknown : Privately published 72 pp., 28 pls. 
 Cernohorsky, W.O. 1974. The taxonomy of some Indo-Pacific Mollusca with description of a new species. Part 2. Records of the Auckland Institute and Museum 11: 121–142, 38 figs 
 Röckel, D., Korn, W. & Kohn, A.J. 1995. Manual of the Living Conidae. Volume 1: Indo-Pacific Region. Wiesbaden : Hemmen 517 pp. 
 Monteiro A. (2009) A new subspecies of Conus moluccensis Küster, 1838 (Mollusca: Gastropoda) from Tahiti. Visaya 2(5): 88–90. 
 Puillandre N., Duda T.F., Meyer C., Olivera B.M. & Bouchet P. (2015). One, four or 100 genera? A new classification of the cone snails. Journal of Molluscan Studies. 81: 1–23

External links
 The Conus Biodiversity website
 
 Cone Shells – Knights of the Sea

moluccensis
Gastropods described in 1838